Nandrudayan Vinayaka Temple is a Hindu temple situated in East Boulevard Road in the neighbourhood of Devathanam in Tiruchirappalli district. The presiding deity is the Hindu god Ganesha. The Nandrudayan Vinayaka Temple is the only temple which contains an idol of Ganesha depicted in human form.

History 

The Nandrudayan Vinayaka Temple is one of the oldest Hindu temples in Tiruchirappalli city. The 7th century Nayanmar, Campantar  has sung in praise of it.

Architecture 

The temple is built in the Dravidian style of architecture and contains a 5-foot tall idol of Vinayaka in human form with an enormous Nandi facing it on the eastern side. There is also a separate shrine with a 4-foot statue of Adi Vinayaka within the temple complex.  There are idols of Adi Sankara, Veda Vyasa, Gayatri, Sadasiva Brahmendra and Pattinathar within the smaller shrine.

Notes

References 

 

Hindu temples in Tiruchirappalli district
Ganesha temples